Heise may refer to:

People with the surname 
 Bob Heise (born 1947), American Major League Baseball player
 David R. Heise (born 1937), American sociologist
 Geoff Heise, American actor
 Georg Arnold Heise (1778–1851), an influential German legal scholar 
 Peter Arnold Heise (1830–1879), Danish composer (Drot og marsk, "King and Marshal")
 Philip Heise (born 1991), German footballer
 Taylor Heise (born 2000), American ice hockey player
 William Heise, American film director, The Kiss (1896)

Other 
 Heise, Idaho, a community in the United States
 Heinz Heise, German publishing house (including Heise Online)